Morfitt is a surname. Notable people with the surname include: 

Darren Morfitt (born 1973), English actor
George L. Morfitt (auditor general), Canadian squash player, public servant, and businessman
Jack Morfitt (1908–1973), English footballer
Samuel Morfitt (1868–1954), English rugby player